Steven Frederick Eyre (born 9 May 1972) is an English football manager who was formerly assistant manager at Doncaster Rovers. Born in Salford, his father is ex-player and radio pundit Fred Eyre.

Playing career
Eyre played for several non-League clubs in the northwest of England, including Chorley.

Managerial career
After quitting playing aged 19 to take up coaching Eyre moved up the ranks to coach Manchester City's youth team, with whom he won five youth league titles and led the club to two FA Youth Cup final appearances, winning in 2008. He spent 21 years with Manchester City.

On 13 June 2011, Eyre was appointed Rochdale manager, after Keith Hill joined Barnsley.

On 19 December 2011, with the club in 22nd place in League One, Rochdale terminated the contracts of Eyre and his assistant Frankie Bunn.

On 12 April 2012, Eyre was appointed the role of Senior Professional Development Coach at League One club Huddersfield Town, taking a leading role in the club's Development Squad. Following Simon Grayson's sacking on 24 January 2013, he and Mark Lillis became joint caretaker managers until a successor was chosen.

In March 2022, he joined League One side Doncaster Rovers as part of Gary McSheffrey backroom staff, replacing Glyn Hodges who had joined Bradford City weeks earlier.

On 17 October 2022, Eyre along with Gary McSheffrey were sacked by Doncaster Rovers.

Media work
In late 2020 he started to summarise Bolton Wanderers matches for local radio. He also summarises for BBC Radio Lancashire.

Honours

Coach
 Manchester City
 FA Youth Cup 2007–08

Personal life
Eyre is married to Claire, with whom he has three daughters.

References

1972 births
Living people
Footballers from Salford
English football managers
Rochdale A.F.C. managers
English Football League managers
Manchester City F.C. non-playing staff
Huddersfield Town A.F.C. non-playing staff
Chesterfield F.C. non-playing staff
Fleetwood Town F.C. non-playing staff
Doncaster Rovers F.C. non-playing staff 
Association footballers not categorized by position
Association football players not categorized by nationality
Huddersfield Town A.F.C. managers